Minzitarovo (Meñyetär) is a rural locality (a selo) and the administrative centre of Ukteyevsky Selsoviet, Iglinsky District, Bashkortostan, Russia. The population was 514 as of 2010. There are 14 streets.

Geography 
Minzitarovo is located 11 km north of Iglino (the district's administrative centre) by road. Sart-Lobovo is the nearest rural locality.

References 

Rural localities in Iglinsky District